Egis is an international company active in the consulting, construction engineering and mobility service sectors that design and operate intelligent infrastructure and buildings. Egis operates in 120 countries and has 16,200 employees.

History
In January 2022, Tikehau Capital acquired 40% stake in Egis.

Acquisitions

In 2022, Egis acquired several companies: in Asia: Sunland (Hong Kong), a consulting and building engineering company with 130 employees. In the Middle East: Waagner Biro Bridge Services International, an infrastructure engineering, operation and maintenance company. In Europe: NordSignal (France), specializing in railway signalling; Weston Williamson + Partners (United Kingdom), an international architecture and urban design firm; Nebu Transport Services (Netherlands), specializing in the recovery of VAT and excise duties in the Benelux.

In 2021, Egis acquired two companies in United Kingdom: CPMS TOPCO and its operational arm, Collaborative Project Management Services Limited to become a key player in the U.K. rail and infrastructure market  and Galson Sciences Ltd, an international consulting and research firm based in Oakham and specialising in radioactive waste management and disposal.
In the Middle East, Egis completed the acquisition of Projacs International bringing the ownership to 95.45%. Projacs is a local engineering consultancy and project management company. In Australia, Australian strategic advisory, project delivery and technical services consultancy Indec joined Egis. 
In France, Egis acquired MT3, a consulting and engineering company in mobility and related applications, and 3 companies in the building sector: Openergy(digitization of energy performance), Kern (organization and operation management) as well as AD Ingé and AD Conseil (asbestos removal, deconstruction & circular economy).

In 2020, 2 French companies have joined Egis: Est Signalisation a railway signalling works company and Kanopée SAS, a consulting firm in the hotel, tourism & leisure industries.

In 2019, Hong Kong-based engineering firm Inhabit (envelope and environmental engineering) joined Egis.

In December 2022,  Egis has started the acquisition process for two companies: New Zealand’s Calibre Professional Services and the Middle Eastern arm of design practice U+A.

Criticism

Involvement in Israeli settlements

On 12 February 2020, the United Nations published a database of companies doing business related in the West Bank, including East Jerusalem, as well as in the occupied Golan Heights. The Egis Group was listed on the database on account of the activities of its subsidy Egis Rail Israel in Israeli settlements in these occupied territories, which are considered illegal under international law.

References

Companies based in Paris-Saclay
Engineering companies of France